Buttermilk Creek may refer to:

In Canada
 Buttermilk Creek (Renfrew County), a tributary of the Muskrat River in the township of Whitewater Region, Ontario
 Buttermilk Creek (Lambton County), a tributary of Stonehouse Drain in the town of Petrolia, Ontario

In the United States
 Buttermilk Creek Complex, an archaeological site west of Salado, Texas
 A creek in Buttermilk Falls State Park, southwest of Ithaca, New York
 A tributary of Cattaraugus Creek, in western New York
 A stream in Alpha, Wisconsin
 A park in Fond du Lac, Wisconsin
 A tributary of Sweetwater Creek (Chattahoochee River), in Georgia
 A stream that runs through Robinson Township, Brown County, Kansas
 Buttermilk Creek (Susquehanna River)
 Buttermilk Creek (Cayuga Inlet), a tributary of Cayuga Inlet in New York

See also